Hedwig Heyl (c. 1853 - January 23, 1934) was a German businesswoman and author, active in social welfare causes.

She was born in Bremen in 1850.  Her father was the industrialist Edouard Crüsemann.  She married Georg Heyl at age 18, and when she was widowed at age 49 she took over running the business—a very unusual thing for a woman to do at that time.  She organized the National Women's Service League in Germany during World War I and set up soup kitchens around Berlin.  She was the head of the 1904 International Women's Congress in Berlin.  She organized an exhibition in Berlin called "Woman in Her Home and Occupational Life" in 1906.  She was the author of a popular German cookbook, Das ABC der Küche (The ABCs of the Kitchen).  In 1920 she received an honorary degree from the University of Berlin.

References

Sources 

 
 

Cookbook writers
German women
1850s births
1934 deaths